Steven Dudley Forbes (born 24 December 1975) is an English former professional footballer who played as a midfielder.

Career

Born in Stoke Newington, London, Forbes played for Football League clubs including Millwall, Colchester United and Peterborough United. He made just under 100 Football League appearances.

Forbes began his career at Sittingbourne, before being purchased by Millwall for £50,000. He made five league substitute appearances during his time with Millwall, before signing for Colchester United. He had his best spell whilst with the U's, helping them secure promotion via the 1997–98 Division Three playoffs and scoring four goals in 56 league appearances, 36 of which were starts. He went out on loan during the 1998–99 season to Peterborough, where he made three appearances before returning to Colchester. He was signed by Stevenage Borough in April 2000 after being released, and later signed for Dagenham & Redbridge in the summer of 2000. He subsequently joined Hendon and also made appearances for Billericay Town. He was last seen playing for Eastleigh in 2007.

Honours

Club
 Colchester United
 Football League Division Three Playoff Winner (1): 1997–98

References

External links 
 
 Steve Forbes at Colchester United Archive Database

1975 births
Living people
Footballers from Stoke Newington
English footballers
Sittingbourne F.C. players
Millwall F.C. players
Colchester United F.C. players
Peterborough United F.C. players
Stevenage F.C. players
Dagenham & Redbridge F.C. players
Hendon F.C. players
Billericay Town F.C. players
Eastleigh F.C. players
Association football midfielders
English Football League players